Eugnosta brownana is a species of moth   of the family Tortricidae. It is found in Texas, New Mexico, Arizona and possibly Mexico.

The length of the forewings is 4.2–7.1 mm for males and 4.6–7.1 mm for females. The forewings are buff-yellow, but the costa is pale reddish brown at the base. The postmedian fascia are reddish brown and the subterminal fascia are reddish brown. The hindwings are pale grey to buff-yellow,
overlaid with grey scales.

Etymology
The species is named for John W. Brown.

References

Moths described in 2012
Eugnosta